Microlepidogaster arachas is a species of armored catfish endemic to tributaries of the rio Araguari, rio Perdizes, and rio Dourados, all pertaining to the rio Paranaíba drainage, upper rio Paraná basin in Brazil.

References

Otothyrinae
Catfish of South America
Fish of Brazil
Endemic fauna of Brazil
Taxa named by Pablo Cesar Lehmann-Albornoz
Taxa named by Bárbara Borges Calegari
Taxa named by Francisco Langeani-Neto 
Fish described in 2013